Praetorius, Prätorius, Prætorius was the name of several musicians and scholars in Germany.

In 16th and 17th century Germany it became a fashion for educated people named "Schulze," "Schultheiß," or "Richter" (which means "judge"), to Latinise their names as "Praetorius," referring to a former official position called "Praetor urbanus."

 Anton Praetorius (1560–1613), pastor, fighter against the persecution of witches and against torture
 Bartholomaeus Praetorius (c.1590–1623), composer and cornettist
 Christoph Praetorius (died 1609), composer, and uncle of Michael
 Franz Praetorius (1847–1927), semitist and Hebraist
 Hieronymus Praetorius (1560–1629), composer and organist
 Ida Praetorius (born 1993), Danish ballerina
 Jacob Praetorius (c.1530–1586), composer and organist, and father of Hieronymus
 Jacob Praetorius (1586–1651), composer, organist and teacher, and son of Hieronymus
 Johannes Praetorius (1537–1616), mathematician and astronomer
 Johannes Praetorius (musician) (1595–1660), organist and composer; son of Hieronymus and brother of Jacob
 Johannes Praetorius (writer) (1630–1680), writer and polymath, real name Hans Schultze
 Matthäus Prätorius (1635–1704), pastor, priest, historian, ethnographer
 Michael Praetorius (c.1571–1621), composer ("Terpsichore"), music theorist, and organist
 Stephan Praetorius (1536–1603), theologian

Other uses
"Praetorius (Courante)," a song by Blackmore’s Night from their 2001 album Fires at Midnight
 Cary Grant plays Dr. Noah Praetorius in People Will Talk (1951; dir. Joseph Mankiewicz).
Praetorius (film), 1965 West German film

See also
Pretorius (disambiguation)
Scultetus